Filmworks Anthology (subtitled 20 Years of Soundtrack Music) is a compilation album featuring selections from the first fifteen Filmworks albums by John Zorn and one previously unreleased track which was issued on the Tzadik label in 2005.

Reception

The Allmusic review by Thom Jurek awarded the album 4 stars stating "For those intimidated by the sheer number of volumes comprising Zorn's Film Works series (18 as of October 2006), this is a great place to start. The full range of Zorn's moods, colors, textures, and, of course, humor comes across in these cues".

Track listing
All compositions by John Zorn
 "Main Title: She Must Be Seeing Things" - 1:05 from Filmworks 1986–1990   
 "End Titles: White and Lazy" - 2:00 from Filmworks 1986–1990   
 "Yakisoba" - 1:17 from Filmworks VII: Cynical Hysterie Hour   
 "Punk Rock Hero" - 0:57 from Filmworks VII: Cynical Hysterie Hour    
 "Through the Night" - 1:31 from Filmworks VII: Cynical Hysterie Hour    
 "Surfing Samba" - 1:11 from Filmworks VII: Cynical Hysterie Hour    
 "Fanfare/Theme: The Golden Boat" - 3:30 from Filmworks 1986–1990   
 "France: Weiden and Kennedy Nike Spot" - 0:16 from Filmworks III: 1990–1995   
 "Sweden: Weiden and Kennedy Nike Spot" - 0:30 from Filmworks III: 1990–1995   
 "Arsenal Dance Mix" - 3:59 from Filmworks II: Music for an Untitled Film by Walter Hill   
 "Main Title: Hollywood Hotel" - 1:36 from Filmworks III: 1990–1995   
 "Wheelchair Racers: Weiden and Kennedy Commercial Spot" - 0:43 from Filmworks III: 1990–1995    
 "Pueblo" - 9:01 from Filmworks IV: S&M + More   
 "Lituus" - 1:06 from Filmworks V: Tears of Ecstasy   
 "Fireworks" - 1:53 from Filmworks VI: 1996   
 "End Titles: Anton, Mailman" - 3:09 from Filmworks VI: 1996
 "Deseo" - 2:28 from Filmworks VIII: 1997  
 "Shanghai" - 2:38 from Filmworks VIII: 1997   
 "Trembling Before G-d" - 2:26 from Filmworks IX: Trembling Before G-d   
 "Filming" - 5:51 from Filmworks X: In the Mirror of Maya Deren   
 "Sabbos Noir" - 2:09 from Filmworks XI: Secret Lives   
 "Chippy Charm" - 1:36 from Filmworks XII: Three Documentaries   
 "Vocal Phase" - 3:53 from Filmworks XII: Three Documentaries   
 "Shaolin Spirit" - 3:02 from Filmworks XII: Three Documentaries   
 "Main Title: Invitation to a Suicide" - 4:38 from Filmworks XIII: Invitation to a Suicide   
 "Sekhel (vocal version)" - 4:57 from Filmworks XIV: Hiding and Seeking   
 "Protocols of Zion" - 4:29 from Filmworks XV: Protocols of Zion   
 "Indonesia" - 4:01 previously unreleased

References

Tzadik Records soundtracks
Albums produced by John Zorn
John Zorn soundtracks
2005 soundtrack albums
Film scores
Soundtrack compilation albums
Tzadik Records compilation albums